Andrew Campbell (born 21 July 1956) is an Australian basketball player. He competed in the men's tournament at the 1976 Summer Olympics and the 1984 Summer Olympics.

References

1956 births
Living people
Australian men's basketball players
Olympic basketball players of Australia
Basketball players at the 1976 Summer Olympics
Basketball players at the 1984 Summer Olympics
Place of birth missing (living people)